The National Museum of San Martino is a museum opened to the public in Naples in 1866, after the unification of Italy, after the Charterhouse included among the suppressed ecclesiastical assets, was declared a national monument.

By the will of the Neapolitan archaeologist Giuseppe Fiorelli, the rooms were intended to collect in a museum evidence of the life of Naples and the southern Kingdoms (Kingdom of Naples and Kingdom of Sicily first and the Kingdom of the Two Sicilies after). The museum, which is spread over two levels, is accessed from the two cloisters of the charterhouse.

Since December 2014, the Ministry of Cultural Heritage and Activities has been managing the museum and charterhouse through the Campania museum complex, which in December 2019 became the Regional Directorate for Museums.

References 

Museums in Naples
Museums established in 1866
National museums of Italy